Asankrangwa Senior High School (also known as ASANCO) is a second cycle institution located in Asankragua in the Wassa Amenfi West District in the Western Region of Ghana.

History 
The school was established in 1991. In 2019, the headmaster of the school was Victor Yanney. The Assistant Headmaster of the school is Daniel Quayson Junior.

References 

High schools in Ghana
1991 establishments in Ghana